Theta Circini (θ Cir), is a binary star located in the southern constellation of Circinus, to the northwest of Alpha Circini. It is faintly visible to the naked eye with an apparent visual magnitude of 5.110. Based upon an annual parallax shift of 11.82 mas, it is located at a distance of about 276 light years from the Sun.

This is an astrometric binary star system with an orbital period of about 39.6 years, an eccentricity of 0.3, and a semimajor axis of 85.64 mas. The pair show a combined stellar classification of B3 Ve, which matches a B-type main sequence star. The 'e' suffix on the class indicates this is a Be star. Alternate classifications include B4 Vnp and B4npe, with the 'n' indicating broad ("nebulous") absorption lines due to rotation and the 'p' meaning a chemically peculiar star. The two components appear to have similar visual magnitude, mass, and classification. The system behaves as a Gamma Cassiopeiae variable showing occasional outbursts of up to 0.27 in magnitude.

References

External links
http://server3.wikisky.org/starview?object_type=1&object_id=2046
http://varsao.com.ar/Curva_theta_Cir.htm  (light curve)

Circini, Theta
Gamma Cassiopeiae variable stars
Circinus (constellation)
Circini, Theta
131492
073129
5551
Astrometric binaries
Durchmusterung objects